Tyler Christopher  Herro (born January 20, 2000) is an American professional basketball player for the Miami Heat of the National Basketball Association (NBA). He played college basketball for one year with the Kentucky Wildcats.

After being selected by the Heat in the first round of the 2019 NBA draft with the 13th overall pick, Herro was named to the NBA All-Rookie Second Team in 2020. During his rookie season with the Heat, he reached the NBA Finals. He was named the NBA Sixth Man of the Year in 2022.

High school career
Herro was born in Greenfield and graduated from Whitnall High School in Greenfield, Wisconsin. In his senior season, he was named to the First Team All-State as he averaged 32.9 points, 7.4 rebounds, 3.6 assists, and 3.3 steals per game; his field goal percentage was over 50 and his three-point shooting percentage was 43.5. He scored more than 2,000 points in his high school career.

In high school, Herro received scholarship offers from the University of Wisconsin–Madison, Marquette University, DePaul University, Oregon State University and Arizona State University. He committed to play for the University of Wisconsin after visiting the Madison campus many times. The commitment to the University of Wisconsin–Madison program was made before his junior year of high school in September 2016. In 2017 University of Kentucky coach John Calipari came to the Whitnall High School gymnasium to see Herro play in person. Herro then de-committed from Wisconsin on October 17, 2017. When Herro was no longer committed to play for Madison, he was recruited by the University of Kansas and University of Kentucky.
Calipari offered Herro a scholarship on October 31, 2017. Herro then visited the Kentucky campus and decided to play for Kentucky. Herro signed his letter of intent with Kentucky on November 14, 2017.

College career
Herro averaged 14.0 points, 4.5 rebounds, and 2.5 assists as the only player to start in all 37 games for the Kentucky Wildcats. On February 27, 2019, he scored a collegiate career-high 29 points, making 9 of 10 field goals and all of 6 free throws, to lead the Wildcats to a comeback victory over the Arkansas Razorbacks, 70–66. Among other distinctions earned, he was named an All-Freshman First Team selection by Basketball Times as well as the Southeastern Conference Rookie of the Year by the Associated Press. On April 12, 2019, Herro declared for the 2019 NBA draft, forgoing his final three years of college eligibility and hiring an agent. He was listed as a mid-first-round selection in most mock drafts.

Professional career

Miami Heat (2019–present)

2019–2021: Rookie season and Finals appearance 
On June 20, 2019, Herro was selected by the Miami Heat with the 13th overall pick in the 2019 NBA draft. On July 10, the Heat announced that they had signed Herro. On October 23, he made his NBA debut, starting in a 120–101 victory over the Memphis Grizzlies and finishing the season-opener with 14 points to go along with 8 rebounds, 2 steals and an assist. In his fourth game (and first non-start), Herro scored a career-high 29 points on October 29 in a 112–97 win over the Atlanta Hawks. Herro was due to play in the Rising Stars game during the All Star Weekend in 2020, but was ruled out due to an ankle injury. On August 12, 2020, he scored a career-high 30 points in a 116–115 loss to the Oklahoma City Thunder.

When the Heat defeated the Milwaukee Bucks in the second round of the 2020 NBA playoffs on September 8, 2020, Herro became the first player in NBA history born in the 2000s to appear in an NBA Conference Finals game. On September 15, he was named to the 2019–20 NBA All-Rookie Second Team by the NBA. In Game 4 of the 2020 Eastern Conference Finals, he scored a career-high 37 points, becoming the fourth player in playoffs history to record 30+ points before turning 21 and the second-highest scorer under 21, with only Magic Johnson scoring more. He also set Conference Finals records for the youngest player (at 20 years, 247 days old) to score 30+ points and the most points by a rookie. After an Eastern Conference Finals victory against the Boston Celtics, Herro became the first player born in the 2000s to play in an NBA Finals.

During Game 2 of the 2020 NBA Finals, Herro became the youngest player to start an NBA Finals game at 20 years, 256 days - eight days younger than Magic Johnson was when he started Game 1 for the Lakers in 1980 against the Philadelphia 76ers. In Game 4 of the same Finals series, he achieved the most 3 pointers made by a rookie in NBA Playoffs history, accomplishing 45 beyond-the-arc shots while surpassing Matt Maloney's 43 3PM record during 1997 NBA Playoffs. On October 9, 2020, Herro broke a 44-year-old record by scoring 10 points on the 3rd quarter of the Game 5 of the 2020 NBA Finals - setting the NBA record by a rookie for the most consecutive games in the playoffs scoring in double digits with 20 while surpassing Alvan Adams's record of 19 games of the Phoenix Suns in 1976. The Heat lost the series in 6 games to the Los Angeles Lakers.

On January 12, 2021, Herro scored a season-high 34 points, alongside seven rebounds and four assists, in a 134–137 overtime loss to the Philadelphia 76ers. On February 17, he grabbed a career-high tying 15 rebounds, alongside 11 points and four assists, in a 112–120 loss to the Golden State Warriors. On May 16, Herro logged a career-high 11 assists, alongside 16 points and six rebounds, in a 120–107 win over the Detroit Pistons. In the playoffs, the Heat lost in four games to the Milwaukee Bucks during the first round.

2021–present: Sixth Man of the Year and contract extension 
On October 23, 2021, Herro became the first player in Heat franchise history to record at least 30 points and 10 rebounds off the bench, which he achieved in a 102–91 loss to the Indiana Pacers. On April 5, 2022, he scored a season-high 35 points, alongside six rebounds and three assists, in a 144–115 win over the Charlotte Hornets. Herro was named the 2022 NBA Sixth Man of the Year, making him the first player in Heat franchise history to win the award.

During the first round of the playoffs, the Heat eliminated the Atlanta Hawks in five games. On May 2, 2022, during the Heat's second round series against the Philadelphia 76ers, Herro recorded 25 points and seven assists in a 106–92 Game 1 win. The Heat defeated the 76ers in six games and advanced to the Eastern Conference Finals, where they faced the Boston Celtics. Herro missed games 3 through 6 of the series with a groin injury. He returned for Game 7, but only played seven minutes as the Heat were eliminated in a 96–100 loss.

On October 2, 2022, Herro signed a 4-year, $130 million contract extension with the Miami Heat. On November 2, Herro put up 26 points alongside a game-winning three in a 110–107 win over the Sacramento Kings.  On November 27, Herro recorded his first career triple-double with 11 points, 11 rebounds and 10 assists in a 106–98 victory over the Atlanta Hawks. On December 15, Herro put up a career-high 41 points on 10-of-15 shooting from three-point range alongside five rebounds in a 111—108 win over the Houston Rockets. He also became the youngest player in NBA history to put up at least 40 points, 10 three-pointers made, and five rebounds in a game. On December 31, Herro put up a buzzer-beating, game-winning three-pointer in a 126–123 win against the Utah Jazz. He finished the game with 29 points, nine rebounds, six assists and two steals.

Career statistics

NBA

Regular season

|-
| style="text-align:left;"| 
| style="text-align:left;"| Miami
| 55 || 8 || 27.4 || .428 || .389 || .870 || 4.1 || 2.2 || .6 || .2 || 13.5
|-
| style="text-align:left;"| 
| style="text-align:left;"| Miami
| 54 || 15 || 30.3 || .439 || .360 || .803 || 5.0 || 3.4 || .6 || .3 || 15.1
|-
| style="text-align:left;"| 
| style="text-align:left;"| Miami
| 66 || 10 || 32.6 || .447 || .399 || .868 || 5.0 || 4.0 || .7 || .1 || 20.7
|- class="sortbottom"
| style="text-align:center;" colspan="2"| Career
| 175 || 33 || 30.3 || .440 || .385 || .851 || 4.7 || 3.2 || .6 || .2 || 16.7

Playoffs

|-
| style="text-align:left;"|2020
| style="text-align:left;"|Miami
| 21 || 5 || 33.6 || .433 || .375 || .870 || 5.1 || 3.7 || .4 || .1 || 16.0
|-
| style="text-align:left;"|2021
| style="text-align:left;"|Miami
| 4 || 0 || 23.2 || .316 || .316 || 1.000 || 3.3 || 1.8 || .3 || .3 || 9.3
|-
| style="text-align:left;"|2022
| style="text-align:left;"|Miami
| 15 || 0 || 25.4 || .409 || .229 || .926 || 3.9 || 2.8 || .6 || .4 || 12.6
|- class="sortbottom"
| style="text-align:center;" colspan="2"|Career
| 40 || 5 || 29.5 || .415 || .323 || .898 || 4.5 || 3.2 || .5 || .2 || 14.0

College

|-
| style="text-align:left;"| 2018–19
| style="text-align:left;"| Kentucky
| 37 || 37 || 32.6 || .462 || .355 || .935 || 4.5 || 2.5 || 1.1 || .3 || 14.0

Personal life
Herro has two younger brothers, Austin and Myles, both of whom also play basketball. His parents are Jennifer and Chris Herro.

Herro was included in the Jack Harlow song "Tyler Herro" named after himself, and features prominently in the music video.

In 2020, Herro began dating Katya Elise Henry. On June 5, 2021, they announced that they were expecting a child. Their daughter was born on September 14, 2021. On June 18, 2022, the couple announced that they were expecting a second child.

References

External links

 Kentucky Wildcats bio

2000 births
Living people
American men's basketball players
Basketball players from Milwaukee
Kentucky Wildcats men's basketball players
Miami Heat draft picks
Miami Heat players
People from Greenfield, Wisconsin
Shooting guards